Tina Blau, later Tina Blau-Lang (15 November 1845 – 31 October 1916) was an Austrian landscape painter.

Life 
She took lessons, successively, with August Schaeffer and Wilhelm Lindenschmit in Munich (1869–1873). She also studied with Emil Jakob Schindler and they shared a studio from 1875 to 1876, but allegedly broke off the engagement after a quarrel. Later, at the art colony in Plankenberg Castle, near Neulengbach, she briefly became his student again.

In 1883, she converted from Judaism to the Evangelical Lutheran Church and married Heinrich Lang, a painter who specialized in horses and battle scenes. In 1890, her first major exhibition was held there. Blau exhibited her work at the Palace of Fine Arts at the 1893 World's Columbian Exposition in Chicago, Illinois.

After her husband's death, she spent ten years travelling in Holland and Italy. After her return, she established a studio in the Rotunde.

She spent her last summer working in Bad Gastein, then went to a sanatorium in Vienna for a medical examination. She died there of cardiac arrest. She was given an "Ehrengrab" (Honor Grave) in the Zentralfriedhof. The Vienna Künstlerhaus auctioned off her estate and held a major retrospective in 1917.

References

Further reading 
 Tobias Natter, Claus Jesina: Tina Blau (1845–1916). Verlag Galerie Welz, Salzburg 1999, .
 Monika Salzer, Peter Karner: Vom Christbaum zur Ringstraße. Evangelisches Wien. Picus, Vienna, 2008, .

External links 

 
 "Frauen in Bewegung": multiple short biographies @ the Österreichische Nationalbibliothek

19th-century Austrian painters
20th-century Austrian painters
Artists from Vienna
1845 births
1916 deaths
Austrian women painters
20th-century Austrian women artists
19th-century Austrian women artists
Converts to Lutheranism from Judaism
Austrian Lutherans
19th-century Lutherans